Goring-by-Sea railway station is in Goring by Sea in the county of West Sussex. It is  down the line from Brighton. The station is operated by Southern. It serves the Worthing suburb of Goring and the neighbouring village of Ferring. It is also located between two education facilities, thus providing a method of transport for students of St. Oscar Romero Catholic School and Northbrook College's West Durrington campus, also known as University Centre Worthing.

This station has a ticket office which is open for part of the day. There is a self-serve ticket machine on either platform at the station.
All Southern trains are served by either Class 377's and Class 313s and Thameslink trains are served by Class 700's at this station.

History 
Opened by the Brighton & Chichester Railway on 16 March 1846, Goring-By-Sea is one of the oldest stations on the Sussex coast. Originally called ‘Goring’ and constructed with just a single track, it was soon absorbed by the London, Brighton, and South Coast Railway (LBSCR) who quickly doubled the track.

In 1890, a three road goods yard was opened. A ‘Saxby & Farmer’ signalbox was opened on the upside (platform 1) in 1900 and, in the same year, a cast iron footbridge was constructed. The station was renamed to ‘Goring-by-Sea’ in 1908 to avoid any confusion with Goring & Streatley station on the Great Western mainline. The track was electrified in 1938. In 1958, an awning was constructed over platform 1.

As with all local stations, ownership was transferred to the Southern Railway in 1923 and, subsequently, British Railways in 1948. Although the goods yard was closed in 1962, and the signal box was removed when manual signalling was abolished in 1988, the station has won the ‘Best Kept Station’ for many years. In 1987, the station was refurbished under the new management of Network SouthEast.

In 2020, platform 1 was extended so it could accommodate an 8-carriage train. The cast iron footbridge was renovated in 2021.

Services 
Off-peak, all services at Goring-by-Sea are operated by Southern using  EMUs.

The typical off-peak service in trains per hour is:
 2 tph to  via 
 1 tph to 
 2 tph to 
 1 tph to 

Facilities 
Facilities are limited and is the smallest station on the West Coastway line from Littlehampton to Brighton with 3 or more trains per hour on each platform:
Ticket Office
Telephone
Departure boards on each platform and in ticket hall
Ticket machines on each platform
Information point
Seating around station
Car Park
Bicycle storage

Gallery

References

External links 

Worthing
Railway stations in West Sussex
DfT Category E stations
Former London, Brighton and South Coast Railway stations
Railway stations in Great Britain opened in 1846
Railway stations served by Govia Thameslink Railway
1846 establishments in England